Panda, Punnaiah (1918 – 26 February 2010) was an eminent industrialist in India.

Profile
Born in Doddavaram village of Prakasam district, he graduated from Andhra Christian College, Guntur, Andhra Pradesh.

With 20 years of executive experience in industrial administration, he co-founded Nava Bharat Ventures Limited (formerly Nava Bharat Ferro Alloys Limited) in 1972, with Alluri Sarvaraya Chowdary and Dr. Devineni Subba Rao and was appointed Resident Director in 1974. He became the Joint Managing Director of Nava Bharat Ventures in 1980. He was also the Executive Chairman of both Beardsell Limited and Prakasam Sugar Complex Limited.

References

External links
 Nava Bharat Ventures Limited
 Beardsell Limited

1918 births
2010 deaths
Telugu people
Businesspeople from Andhra Pradesh
People from Prakasam district